The Korean Unmanned System (KUS)-FS medium-altitude long-endurance (MALE) is an unmanned aerial vehicle (UAV) developed by South Korea. Previously known as the Medium-Altitude UAV, the KUS-FS MALE UAV is being developed for the Republic of Korea Air Force (RoKAF) and is in the same class as the US-built General Atomics MQ-9 Reaper UAV. The ROKAF plans to procure two to three complete MUAV systems, totaling about 10 air vehicles, with introduction planned by 2025.

References